Ritualcide is the systematic destruction or alteration of traditional ritual practices and their sequencing across five ritual domains akin to most cultures (birth, illness, courtship, marriage and death, which include ancestor obligations). Rituals have a prescribed form, source, and sequence that include sacred objects, places, times and seasons, music, dance, texts, songs and words, and mediators (such as monks, spirit mediums, and traditional healers and nature-infused sources, such as trees, birds, water and so on). Ritualcide primes genocide. In particular, when regimes tamper with collective tradition, inhabitants become vulnerable and/or susceptible to spirit-based harm. As Indigenous people loose access to sources of spirit protection, their angst increases and compliance may increase due to fear of animist harm. 

The term ritualcide was coined by Peg LeVine in Love and Dread in Cambodia: Weddings, Births and Ritual Harm Under the Khmer Rouge, which emerged from an eight-year ethnographic study into Khmer Rouge weddings and Cambodian rituals (2010). LeVine meticulously studied ritual history before, during and after Democratic Kampuchea. The definition was expanded in 2015 when LeVine continued research at the Shoah Foundation, Center for Advanced Genocide Research. In October, 2016, ritualcide was introduced at the Extraordinary Chambers in the Courts of Cambodia (ECCC) in conjunction with Khmer Rouge activity between 1975 and 1979. LeVine described how ritual loss complicates the aftermath of trauma for the living and the dead, and ruptures the cosmological order that binds ancestors. Without access to reliable, traditional ritual sources, collective fear and vulnerability increase for survivors. In genocide and Holocaust studies, ritual restoration holds relevance for recovery by survivors and ancestors, and their collective sense of protection and cultural continuity.

References

Crimes
International criminal law
Anthropology
Sociology of culture